Lianyungangdong (Lianyungang East) railway station is a station on Longhai railway in Lianyungang, Jiangsu.

History
The station was established in 1935 as Zhongyun railway station.

On 11 November 2009, since Lianyun railway station, the former eastern terminus of Longhai railway, stopped passenger services, the station became the eastern terminus for passenger trains on Longhai railway, and was renamed to the current name.

References

Railway stations in Jiangsu
Stations on the Longhai Railway
Railway stations in China opened in 1935